Iolaus gabunica, the Gabon sapphire, is a butterfly in the family Lycaenidae. It is found in Cameroon, Gabon, Uganda, Kenya and Zambia. The habitat consists of forests.

The larvae feed on Globimetula braunii.

Subspecies
Iolaus gabunica gabunica (Cameroon, Gabon, Uganda, western Kenya, Zambia)
Iolaus gabunica mbami (Libert, 1993) (Cameroon)

References

Butterflies described in 1928
Iolaus (butterfly)